Caphys dubia is a species of snout moth in the genus Caphys. It was described by Warren in 1891, and is known from the West Indies and Brazil.

References

Moths described in 1891
Chrysauginae